Brian Eldon Bye (born June 27, 1954) is a Canadian former professional ice hockey player who played in the World Hockey Association (WHA). Drafted in the eighteenth round of the 1974 NHL amateur draft by the New York Islanders, Bye opted to play in the WHA after being selected by the San Diego Mariners in the ninth round of the 1974 WHA Amateur Draft. He played in one game for the Mariners during the 1975–76 WHA season.

References

External links

1954 births
Canadian ice hockey centres
Greensboro Generals (SHL) players
Ice hockey people from Ontario
Kitchener Rangers players
Living people
New York Islanders draft picks
Roanoke Valley Rebels (SHL) players
San Diego Mariners draft picks
San Diego Mariners players
Sportspeople from Brantford
Syracuse Blazers players